Brilliant (stylised as Brill!ant) is the eleventh and final studio album by British synth-pop band Ultravox, released on 25 May 2012 by Chrysalis Records. It is the group's first studio album in 18 years, and the first in 28 years from the "classic" Ultravox line-up of Midge Ure, consisting of Billy Currie, Warren Cann and Chris Cross (the last being 1984's Lament). The title track was released as its lead single, and premiered on 17 April 2012 on BBC Radio 2.

Brilliant debuted at number 21 on the UK Albums Chart, selling 6,100 copies in its first week. It received mixed reviews from critics.

Background
Ure said in 2012: "We did get along on the reunion tour brilliantly and decided to make an album. It is such a weird thing to do what we did, to lock yourself away like we did in Canada, with no one else around. It was just Billy, Chris and I. Warren had commitments in Los Angeles and he didn't have to be part of it until later on. We were in the middle of the woods, in a cabin by the lake, it is freezing cold and there is no one there to talk to other than the band. But it worked out brilliantly mainly because we got along so well and the creativity was there. So the process of recording this was easy, it was great, it was very vibrant and exciting."

Currie said in 2012: "I discussed it with Midge and Chris as early as May 2009. They were not very interested then. We all got more serious about it while doing the 2010 'Return To Eden Part 2 tour' and in Sweden for the festivals, we spent the travelling time discussing how we would go about it. When we went over to Canada the first time in September 2010, we did not bring ideas with us to work on. I thought that was good. We all felt the same way. We had to start from scratch."

Cann's drums were recorded at Studio City Sound in Los Angeles.

Track listing

Personnel
Credits adapted from the liner notes of Brilliant.

Ultravox
 Warren Cann – drums
 Chris Cross – bass, synthesiser
 Billy Currie – piano, synthesiser, violin
 Midge Ure – vocals, guitar, synthesiser

Technical
 Stephen Lipson – production, mixing
 Ultravox – production, mixing
 Tom Weir – drum engineering
 Mazen Murad – mastering at Metropolis Mastering (London)
 Darren Evans – sleeve design

Charts

Release history

Notes

References

2012 albums
Albums produced by Stephen Lipson
Chrysalis Records albums
Ultravox albums